Castana may refer to a number of towns:

 Castana, Iowa, United States
 Castana, Lombardy, Italy

See also
Chastana, the Western Satrap king
Castano (disambiguation)
Castagna (disambiguation)